Zdena Zimmermannová (born ) is a retired Czech female volleyball player. She was part of the Czech Republic women's national volleyball team.

She participated in the 1994 FIVB Volleyball Women's World Championship. On club level she played with UP Mora Olomouc.

Clubs
 UP Mora Olomouc (1994)

References

1973 births
Living people
Czech women's volleyball players
Place of birth missing (living people)